The Men's K-1 500m event at the 2010 South American Games was held over March 28 at 9:40.

Medalists

Results

References
Final

500m K-1 Men